The Archdeacon of Killaloe, Kilfenora, Clonfert and Kilmacduagh is a senior ecclesiastical officer within the Anglican Diocese of Limerick and Killaloe. As such he or she is responsible for the disciplinary supervision of the clergy  within the Diocese. The current incumbent is Wayne Carney.

The archdeaconry can trace its history back to Donat O'Kennedy, the first known Archdeacon of Killaloe, who became its Bishop in 1231; Charles, Archdeacon of Kilfenora, who held the office in 1302; Meiler De Burgo, Archdeacon of Clonfert,  who held office from 1550 to 1587; and Florence M'Anoglaigh, Archdeacon of Kilmacduagh who held office during 1333.

References

 
 
 
 
 
Lists of Anglican archdeacons in Ireland
Diocese of Limerick and Killaloe